The woodlouse spider (Dysdera crocata) is a species of spider that preys primarily upon woodlice. Other common names refer to variations on the common name of its prey, including woodlouse hunter, sowbug hunter, sowbug killer, pillbug hunter and slater spider.

Appearance

They have six eyes, a tawny orange to dark-red cephalothorax and legs, and a shiny (sometimes very shiny) pale beige to yellow-brown abdomen, sometimes dark grey. Notably, they have disproportionately large chelicerae for a spider of this size. Dysdera crocata is difficult to distinguish from the much less common Dysdera erythrina, although this species is not often found near human habitation.

Distribution
Dysdera crocata, which originated in the Mediterranean area, now has a cosmopolitan distribution (see map), ranging from Eurasia to parts of North and South America, South Africa, Australia, and New Zealand.

Behavior
Woodlouse spiders are usually found under logs, rocks, bricks, plant pots and in leaf litter in warm places, often close to woodlice. They have also been found in houses. They spend the day in a silken retreat made to enclose crevices in, generally, partially decayed wood, but sometimes construct tent-like structures in indents of various large rocks. Woodlouse spiders hunt at night and do not spin webs. Rather than spinning their webs at night, they use this time to search warm places for prey. 
Their diet consists principally of woodlice which—despite their tough exoskeleton—are pierced easily by the spider's large chelicerae; the spider usually stabs and injects venom into the woodlouse's soft underbelly while avoiding any noxious defensive chemicals. The Woodlouse Spider’s powerful jaws are made to impale the thick armor of woodlice and are strong enough to give humans a painful bite. Although the Woodlouse Spider is a dangerous predator to woodlice, it is not known to be a health hazard to humans or smaller animals. Laboratory experiments have shown D. crocata will take other invertebrates, and shows no particular preference for woodlice; these are simply the most common prey in its habitat. Other invertebrates preyed on by D. crocata include silverfish, earwigs, millipedes, burying beetles and crickets. This small but relatively large-fanged spider is very well equipped to prey on underground invertebrates of almost any kind.

Because of its relatively large fangs and wide gape, the woodlouse spider is an unusually dominant predator for its size. Like many other Dysdera spiders, it frequently dominates, and sometimes kills, other spiders and centipedes.

The courtship of these spiders is typically aggressive and mates risk injury from each other's large chelicerae. The female lays her eggs in a silken sac and is believed to look after her young after hatching. These hiding places serve as a nest for the female's sac which can carry up to 70 eggs.

They have been known to bite humans if handled. Verified bites have caused no major medical problems. Localized itchiness at the bite site has been reported in some cases.

References

Further reading

External links

 Platnick, Norman I. (2008): The world spider catalog, version 8.5. American Museum of Natural History.
Pictures of Dysdera crocata (free for noncommercial use)
 Harvard Entomology Bug of the Month - Woodlouse hunter
 Dysdera crocata - GeoSpecies Database University of Wisconsin

Dysderidae
Cosmopolitan spiders